Pahabengkakia piliceps is a species of true bug (harpactorinae) found in Thailand. This species is apparently a specialist predator of the stingless bee Trigona collina. Larval P. piliceps mimic the bees, and eggs are laid in the bees' hives. Nymphs of P. piliceps were found to occupy the nest entrance and kill returning foraging bees.  The assassin bug does not seem to predate other Trigona species (T. apicalis, T. fimbriata, T. nitidiventris, T. terminata, T. ventralis and T. itama), even though they are also present in the area.

References

Reduviidae
Fauna of Thailand